Soad Hosny (26 January 1943 – 21 June 2001) was an Egyptian actress born in Cairo. She was known as the "Cinderella of Egyptian cinema" and one of the most influential actresses in the Middle East and the Arab world. She ascended to stardom at the end of the 1950s, performing in more than 83 films between 1959 and 1991 with a credit of 9 films in the greatest 100 films in the history of Egyptian Cinema. A majority of her films were shot in the 1960s and 1970s. Her final screen appearance was in the 1991 film, The Shepherd and the Women, directed by her ex-husband, Ali Badrakhan.

Early life
Soad Muhammad Kamal Hosny was born in Bulaq district in Cairo, Egypt to Mohammad Hosni, a noted Islamic calligrapher, and his second wife, an Egyptian, Gawhara Mohamed Hassan. Her parents divorced and her mother remarried, to an Egyptian man, Abdul Monem Hafeez, with whom she had six more children, thus giving Soad and her two sisters no fewer than 14 half-siblings. 

Her father's household was known as "the artists' home" because leading artists from across the Arab world regularly visited Hosni's home in Cairo for tuition and social interaction with the master calligrapher. Her father, whose artistic output included the production of frames for the silent movies and book covers, was well known across the artistic community. A number of his children became performance artists. Soad's half-sister, Nagat, was an actress and singer. Her half-brother, Ezz Eddin Hosni (1927–2013), was a music composer and taught both Soad and Najat music and singing. Another sibling, Sami Hosni became a cello player, jewellery designer and also calligrapher. while yet another brother, Farooq, was a painter and his daughter Samira was also an actress.

Career
At the age of three, she began her career when she sang in the popular Egyptian children's TV program, Papa Sharo, a popular program hosted by prominent kids' shows presenter Mohamed Shaaban. Her work included a wide range of genres – from light comedies and romances through to political satire. 

Her film debut was in Hassan and Nayima (1959). She is credited with acting in films with the most notable Egyptian film stars such as Omar Sharif, Salah Zulfikar, Rushdy Abaza and Shoukry Sarhan. Her most well-known role was that of a college student who fell in love with her professor in the film, Hassan El Imam’s Watch Out for ZouZou (1972). Other important film credits include her role in Hassan Al-Imam's Money and Women (1960) opposite Salah Zulfikar, whom she was paired with for the second time in; Appointment at the Tower (1962) directed by Ezz El-Dine Zulficar. In the year 1964, she starred alongside Nadia Lutfi in Mahmoud Zulfikar's For Men Only, the film was a box office hit where she played a role of a girl disguised in a man's appearance to have the opportunity to work in a gas project. Hosny starred in Too Young for Love (1966) opposite Rushdy Abaza.

In 1970, she starred alongside Salah Zulfikar and Rushdy Abaza in the political film; Sunset and Sunrise (1970) of Kamal El Sheikh. She worked in two films directed by Youssef Chahine during her career, the first one was; The Choice (1970), and the second was Those People of the Nile (1972) in which she was paired with Salah Zulfikar for the fourth time. In 1974, she starred in Kamal El Sheikh's Whom Should We Shoot? (1974) alongside Mahmoud Yassin. Her next role was a student and political activist, who was tortured in Karnak (1975), the film was based on the novel by Naguib Mahfouz. In the film, Shafika and Metwali (1979) with Ahmed Zaki and People on the Top (1981) with Nour El-Sherif, she transformed the musical numbers into scathing satires which gave voice to the oppressed. For this and her other hard-hitting, politically relevant roles, she was seen as part of the intelligentsia.

During her lifetime, she was known as the "Cinderella of the screen". She starred in films of every important Egyptian director during the 60s and 70s and played women in complex plots. In her later career, she played women who had been abused or victimised. Due to illness, she retired from acting in the 1991. Hosny's final screen appearance was in The Shepherd and the Women (1991).

Personal life

Soad Hosny was married four times. Around 1968, she was married to cinematographer Salah Kurayyem; the marriage lasted for approximately one year. In 1970, Hosny was married to the Egyptian film director Ali Badrakhan; this marriage lasted for approximately eleven years. She was then married to Zaki Fatin Abdel Wahab, son of Fateen Abdel Wahab and Leila Mourad in 1981. This marriage lasted only five months. Persistent rumours claim that her first marriage was to the actor and singer, Abdel Halim Hafez (1929-1977), popularly known as "al Andaleeb al Asmar" [the tan nightingale], whom she is believed to have married in secret. However, her family have denied the veracity of such rumours.

She was romantically linked with various celebrities including the Egyptian film star, Abdel Halim Hafez. Despite never wearing a wedding dress in all her marriages, Hosni wore the wedding dress many times on screen through her films, and her first film husband was the Egyptian film star Salah Zulfikar in Money and Women of 1960. The rumor of her marriage to Abdel Halim Hafez was not the first in her life. In late 1962, a strong rumor spread in the Egyptian press about her marriage to Salah Zulfikar who’s one of his country's most iconic male performers of all time and was popularly known as "Fares al Ahlem" [Knight of the dreams], while filming with Zulfikar in Appointment at the Tower. Filming of the film scenes began in the Cairo Tower, and the team continued for two weeks on board the ship Aida in the Mediterranean, and after filming ended, the rumor of her marriage to Salah Zulfikar spread in newspapers and magazines at the time. Zulfikar did not forget the nature of his previous work as a police officer and began with his sense of security to investigate the source of the rumor, to make sure that the lighting worker in the film crew was the owner of the rumor after a kiss was filmed between Zulfikar and Soad Hosny, where the kiss lasted for three minutes, until Zulfikar sensed it took them too long and told the cinematographer, "Stop", and so the worker built this rumor because of the shot, but this rumor was denied and later, the two film stars participated in more than one film together. Her fourth and final marriage was to screen writer Maher Awad.

Death
 On 21 June 2001, Soad Hosny died after falling from the balcony of her friend Nadia Yousri's apartment in Stuart Tower building in Westminster. Her death was surrounded by controversy, with authorities initially failing to provide details of how she fell; an omission that fuelled media speculation and rumors that her death may have been a suicide or murder, rather than accidental. Soad's body was flown home to Cairo and her funeral there was attended by over 10,000 people. She was buried in a family's plot of land on the outskirts of Cairo. She had no children and was survived by her last husband, writer Maher Awad, whom she married in 1987.

Legacy

In 2013, Lebanese filmmaker Rania Stephan used snippets from Hosny's films to re-tell Hosny's story and the history of Egyptian cinema in The Three Disappearances of Soad Hosny. It was featured in Berlin's Art Week. The Three Disappearances is an important archive, which while following the chronology of Soad Hosny's career, simultaneously documents the costumes, sets and styles used from the 1950s to the 1990s, a period that marked the peak and decline of Egyptian cinema.

One of Hosny's songs, "I'm going down to the Square" became a popular "anthem" during the 2011 Egyptian revolution.

On 26 January 2022, Google Doodle celebrated Soad Hosny’s 79th birthday.

Filmography

Soad Hosny's film career lasted for 32 years. She is an icon in Egyptian film industry. She was a film, stage, television, and radio actor. She appeared in more than 80 films.

See also
Top 100 Egyptian films.
List of Egyptian films of the 1960s.
List of Egyptian films of the 1970s.

References

Sources

 Terri Ginsberg, Chris Lippard, 2010: Historical Dictionary of Middle Eastern Cinema, Scarecrow Press.
 Ashraf Gharib, 2001: Soad Hosni: Al-Hulm Al-Dai (Soad Hosni: The Lost Dream). (Cf. )
 Mohamed Soweid, 2004: Cabaret Suad, Beirut: Dar al-Adab. (Cf. )

External links

 
 "...Zouzou"
 Profile (citing 1943 year of birth), ElCinema.com;   accessed 26 January 2015.
 Soad Hosny's 79th Birthday at Google Doodle

Articles and essays
 "رسالة السندريلا إلى الله!" (in Arabic; gives 1943 as year of birth)
 "Souad Hosny dies in London after struggling with disease", aawsat.com (in Arabic; gives 1944 as year of birth)

Media portrayals
 
 Cites 1942 as year of birth

1943 births
20th-century Egyptian actresses
20th-century Egyptian women singers
2001 suicides
Actresses from Cairo
Egyptian film actresses
Egyptian people of Kurdish descent
Egyptian television actresses
People from Bulaq
Singers from Cairo
Singers who perform in Egyptian Arabic
Suicides in Westminster
Unsolved deaths in England